Alpha Prime Racing (formerly Martins Motorsports) is an American stock car racing team that competes in the NASCAR Xfinity Series. The team was founded in 2009 by Craig Martins, and fields the No. 43 Chevrolet Camaro SS for multiple drivers, the No. 44 Chevrolet Camaro SS for Jeffery Earnhardt full time, and the No. 45 Chevrolet Camaro SS for multiple drivers full-time. At various points, the team has had partnerships with AM Racing, Faith Motorsports and Brandonbilt Motorsports. The team was inactive in the 2018 and 2019 seasons and changed to their current name starting with the 2022 season.

Xfinity Series

Car No. 43 history 
On September 15, 2022, Alpha Prime Racing announced that Ryan Ellis would return for an increased number of races in 2023 with specific partnership announcements coming at a later date. On December 20, 2022 Alpha Prime Racing announced it would be starting a third car with Ryan Ellis being the primary driver in 25 races with potentially more races being announced at a later date.

Car No. 43 results

Car No. 44 history

On December 24, 2019, two years after shutting down its operations, Martins Motorsports announced its return to the NASCAR Xfinity Series in 2020, with longtime sponsor and family friend Rodney Riessen joining Craig Martins as the team's co-owners. The team will field the No. 44 Chevrolet Camaro SS for Tommy Joe Martins. The team bought chassis from GMS Racing and JGL Racing to help bolster its inventory, which already included a road course car Martins ran for MBM Motorsports in 2019. The team failed to qualify for the season-opening race at Daytona, and had to temporarily lay off all of its employees during the COVID-19 pandemic. Midway through the season, the team hired Buddy Sisco as crew chief and results turned around. On October 24, Martins recorded both his and the team's first top-10 finish at Texas Motor Speedway with a 10th-place finish; Martins had confirmed a 2021 return earlier that month.

On August 30, 2021, the team announced it had formed a partnership with Caesar Bacarella, renaming the team to Alpha Prime Racing (after Bacarella's fitness brand) beginning with the 2022 season. Martins, Bacarella and Rajah Caruth are signed to drive for the team in 2022. On November 22, 2021, Bacarella was suspended indefinitely by NASCAR for a violation of the sanctioning bodies substance abuse policy. A team statement issued by Tommy Joe Martins (in his capacity as General Manager) said that Bacarella had taken a workout supplement that he was unaware was on the banned substance list and that Bacarella is expected to be reinstated in time for the first race of 2022. On February 14, 2022, Bacarella was reinstated by NASCAR; Martins would drive the car in the opening race at Daytona, with Bacarella instead driving the No. 45. 

On December 13, 2022, Alpha Prime Racing said in a press release that Jeffrey Earnhardt will be competing full time for the team in 2023. One of Earnhardt's long-time sponsors, ForeverLawn, will serve as the primary sponsor for the entry for multiple events.

Car No. 44 results

Car No. 45 history
On April 14, 2017, the team announced a nine-race Xfinity slate for 2017 with Tommy Joe Martins, car No. 45 and sponsor Diamond Gusset Jeans, starting with the spring race at Richmond and focusing primarily on short to intermediate tracks with the exception of the Indianapolis race. After failing to qualify and withdrawing from the first two planned events, the No. 45's schedule was folded into a ride with B. J. McLeod Motorsports, which culminated with a career-best 11th-place finish at Iowa for the driver. 

On January 5, 2021, Alpha Prime Racing announced the number for their second full-time entry to be 45 and on January 6 announced Sage Karam to be one of the drivers.

On December 2, 2022, Alpha Prime Racing announced that Sage Karam will be returning in 2023 in 17 racing, starting with the spring race at Atlanta. On December 23, 2022, Alpha Prime announced that Stefan Parsons will also be returning for select races in 2023. Caesar Bacarella will also be driving the car at Daytona and Talledega.

Car No. 45 results

Car No. 67 history 
This car was the team's secondary focus in their 2014 foray, with Clay Greenfield behind the wheel at Daytona. However, he along with Willie Allen failed to qualify, making Martins Motorsports 0 for 2 in that race. The car withdrew the next week after no driver was found to drive it. The team then took time off to prepare for the spring Bristol race, where Tommy Joe Martins crashed in qualifying and withdrew. To recoup from that, the team did not return until Michigan, when Benny Gordon qualified the car but then switched to Martins when he failed to qualify the 76.

Car No. 67 results

Car No. 76 history 

The primary focus in 2014, Nationwide veteran Willie Allen failed to qualify the 76 at Daytona and Bristol. Tommy Joe Martins then took over the reins of what was left as the team's only entry after the demise of the 67, making eight races in the 76 and failing to qualify for four, including its last three attempts. The team primarily start and parked, but ran full races at higher-paying events like at Talladega and Charlotte. The team's last attempt was at Indianapolis Motor Speedway.

Car No. 76 results

Camping World Truck Series

Truck No. 42 history
The team debuted in 2011 at Lucas Oil Raceway with Tommy Joe Martins behind the wheel. The team returned at Iowa Speedway in 2017 with Matt Mills behind the wheel and additional races to be determined. Though the car never hit the track that weekend, the scheme was included in the original version of NASCAR Heat 2. The additional races were in the team's No. 44 entry. Martins returned for the 2017 Jag Metals 350 but a possible suspension problem led to a wrecked truck in practice, and a blown right-front tire three laps into the race ended Martins' weekend. The backup truck was loaned from fellow independent Mike Harmon.

Truck No. 44 history 
The first race for Martins Motorsports was in 2009, when Tommy Joe Martins ran a four race schedule, recording a best finish of 21st at Chicagoland. The team and driver returned for one race as the No. 42 in 2011, finishing 33rd at Lucas Oil Raceway. After taking all of 2015 off to recover from a failed Xfinity Series effort, the team returned in 2016 with Martins as the full-time driver except for a qualifying crash at Martinsville (spot sold to Austin Wayne Self), Eldora (dirt racer J. R. Heffner), and a DNQ at Homestead-Miami.

On February 13, 2017, Martins Motorsports announced a partnership with another family Truck team, Brandonbilt Motorsports, to put driver Brandon Brown in the 44 truck for "select races". However, the operations of the 44 truck ceased with the 2017 Xfinity announcement except for Heffner again piloting the truck at Eldora. After ceasing operations, owner points of the 44 truck were sold to Faith Motorsports. When that team ran into organizational trouble mid-season, Matt Mills drove the truck for a race at Kentucky but crashed out. The much-anticipated return of Heffner the following race was derailed due to a blown engine early in the weekend, the entry never making it to the grid. After the Eldora race, the 44 became a joint-prepared effort between Martins and AM Racing. That relationship lasted through the end of the season except for Faith and Ted Minor running a Las Vegas shooting paint scheme at Texas.

2017 closure 
Following reports two days earlier that longtime crew chief Kevin Eagle had left the team, primary driver and owner Tommy Joe Martins took to Twitter, Periscope and the media to announce the team's closure in late December 2017. The team had plans to compete in a full 2018 NASCAR Camping World Truck Series schedule; however, two drivers signed to drive on handshake deals failed to follow through, leaving the team's financial security in doubt. Tommy Joe, commenting on the situation, noted the irony of the situation that the team had been founded as an underdog, family team and now had to rely on pay drivers to survive, the antithesis of what the team was founded on. Once those drivers with sponsors backed out, Martins said that his family was unwilling to take the $300,000 or $400,000 loss that the team took in 2017. At different points, he called the decision "hard" to give up on a dream, yet "easy" to make financially. He also did not rule out a return to the Xfinity Series but the return did not seem likely at the time of closure. Martins later disclosed that the team had approached Ford Performance to become a partner team but that the manufacturer turned the team down.

References 

American auto racing teams
NASCAR teams
Auto racing teams established in 2009